Anne FitzPatrick, Countess of Upper Ossory (née Liddell, also known as Anne FitzRoy, Duchess of Grafton; c. 1737 – 1804) was an English noblewoman and the first wife of Augustus Henry FitzRoy, 3rd Duke of Grafton. Grafton divorced her while serving as prime minister. She was a noted correspondent of Horace Walpole.

Life
Anne Fitzpatrick (previously Fitzroy  Liddell) was born in 1737 or 1738 in Derby to Anne and Henry Liddell, 1st Baron Ravensworth.

She firstly married Augustus Henry FitzRoy, 3rd Duke of Grafton on 29 January 1756, at her father's house in St James's Square, by special licence of the Archbishop of Canterbury. The marriage was witnessed by Lord Ravensworth and Francis Seymour-Conway, 1st Earl of Hertford.  Together they had three children.

 Lady Georgiana FitzRoy (8 May 1757 – 18 January 1799), who married John Smyth (12 February 1748 – 12 February 1811) on 4 June 1778.
 George Henry FitzRoy, 4th Duke of Grafton (1760–1844).
 General Lord Charles FitzRoy (14 July 1764 – 20 December 1829), who married, firstly, Frances Mundy (1773 – 9 August 1797) on 20 June 1795, and had one son. He married, secondly, Lady Frances Stewart (24 June 1777 – 9 February 1810) on 10 March 1799 and had three children. His sons Sir Charles FitzRoy (1796–1858), governor of New South Wales, and Robert FitzRoy, the hydrographer, were notable for their achievements.

In 1761 she sent a silhouette that Jean Huber had created of her and her daughter to Horace Walpole. This letter was to be the start of a correspondence of 455 letters between herself and Walpole.

After the Duchess had become pregnant by her lover, John FitzPatrick, 2nd Earl of Upper Ossory, she and the Duke were divorced by Act of Parliament, passed 23 March 1769. Three months later, on 24 June 1769, the Duke married Elizabeth Wrottesley (1 November 174525 May 1822), daughter of the Reverend Sir Richard Wrottesley, Dean of Worcester. Anne married FitzPatrick in 1769 and they had two children.

 Lady Anne Fitzpatrick.
 Lady Gertrude Fitzpatrick.

Anne died at her house in Grosvenor Square in 1804.

References

Sources

External links
Fitzpatrick Society - Mac Giolla Phádraig Clan

1730s births
1804 deaths
18th-century English people
19th-century English people
18th-century English women
19th-century English women
Anne
Anne
Spouses of prime ministers of the United Kingdom
Grafton
Upper Ossory
Daughters of barons
Liddell family